In computer software, in compiler theory, an intrinsic function (or built-in function) is a function (subroutine) available for use in a given programming language whose implementation is handled specially by the compiler. Typically, it may substitute a sequence of automatically generated instructions for the original function call, similar to an inline function. Unlike an inline function, the compiler has an intimate knowledge of an intrinsic function and can thus better integrate and optimize it for a given situation.

Compilers that implement intrinsic functions generally enable them only when a program requests optimization, otherwise falling back to a default implementation provided by the language runtime system (environment).

Intrinsic functions are often used to explicitly implement vectorization and parallelization in languages which do not address such constructs. Some application programming interfaces (API), for example, AltiVec and OpenMP, use intrinsic functions to declare, respectively, vectorizable and multiprocessing-aware operations during compiling. The compiler parses the intrinsic functions and converts them into vector math or multiprocessing object code appropriate for the target platform.
Some intrinsics are used to provide additional constraints to the optimizer, such as values a variable cannot assume.

C and C++ 
Compilers for C and C++, of Microsoft,
Intel, and the GNU Compiler Collection (GCC)
implement intrinsics that map directly to the x86 single instruction, multiple data (SIMD) instructions (MMX, Streaming SIMD Extensions (SSE), SSE2, SSE3, SSSE3, SSE4, AVX, AVX2, AVX512, FMA, ...). The Microsoft Visual C++ compiler of Microsoft Visual Studio does not support inline assembly for x86-64. To compensate for this, new intrinsics have been added that map to standard assembly instructions that are not normally accessible through C/C++, e.g., bit scan.

Some C and C++ compilers provide non-portable platform-specific intrinsics. Other intrinsics (such as GNU built-ins) are slightly more abstracted, approximating the abilities of several contemporary platforms, with portable fall back implementations on platforms with no appropriate instructions. It is common for C++ libraries, such as glm or Sony's vector maths libraries, to achieve portability via conditional compilation (based on platform specific compiler flags), providing fully portable high-level primitives (e.g., a four-element floating-point vector type) mapped onto the appropriate low level programming language implementations, while still benefiting from the C++ type system and inlining; hence the advantage over linking to hand-written assembly object files, using the C application binary interface (ABI).

Examples 
 uint64_t __rdtsc       ;                                                          // return internal CPU clock counter
 uint64_t __popcnt64     (uint64_t n);                                                // count of bits set in n
 uint64_t _umul128       (uint64_t Factor1, uint64_t Factor2, uint64_t* HighProduct); // 64 bit * 64 bit => 128 bit multiplication
 __m512   _mm512_add_ps  (__m512 a, __m512 b);                                        // calculates a + b for two vectors of 16 floats
 __m512   _mm512_fmadd_ps(__m512 a, __m512 b, __m512 c);                              // calculates a*b + c for three vectors of 16 floats

Links
Intel Intrinsics

Java 
The HotSpot Java virtual machine's (JVM) just-in-time compiler also has intrinsics for specific Java APIs. Hotspot intrinsics are standard Java APIs which may have one or more optimized implementation on some platforms.

References

External links 
 Intel Intrinsics Guide
 Using milicode routines, IBM AIX 6.1 documentation

Compiler construction